The April 25 House of Culture is a theatre located in Pyongyang, North Korea. It was built in 1974–1975 to provide a venue for military education, and was originally called the February 8 House of Culture. It is located on Pipha Street in the Moranbong District of Pyongyang. The classically colonnaded building is considered one of the best examples of 1970s socialist monumentality in North Korea, the other being the visually similar Mansudae Art Theatre.

It has been the location of many historic events, from the 6th, 7th, and 8th congresses of the Korean Workers' Party, to the historic meeting of Kim Jong-il with the president of South Korea, Roh Moo-hyun, in 2007.

Construction
A  site was cleared and actual construction on the theatre building was begun in April 1974. It contains two large theatres with 6,000 seats and 1,100 seats respectively with a cinema theatre of 600 seats. The building opened on 7 October 1975.

Name
The building as proposed was originally named the February 8 House of Culture after the date of the founding of the Korean People's Army (KPA). It was opened under this name and the 6th Congress of the Workers' Party of Korea was held there on 10 to 14 October 1980,  under this name. After the congress the building was sometimes referred to as Congress Hall; however, subsequently the name was changed to the April 25 House of Culture, the founding date of the resistance army against the Japanese, in order to reflect the historical connection, and the continuity, with the KPA. North Korea's Military Foundation Day had been changed earlier, in 1978, from 9 February to 25 April.

Usage 
The April 25 House of Culture is home to the April 25th Culture and Art Composition Office, which is in charge of organizing major KPA cultural events, including international conferences and state funerals.  In addition to meetings for military education, awards and solidarity, and official state ceremonies and party meetings such as the 6th and 7th Congresses of the Workers' Party of Korea, the theatres in the 25 April House of Culture are used for cultural events such as performances by the Korean People's Army Ensemble, or the band Moranbong.

The building rarely sees visits by tourists.

In North Korean culture 
The North Korean postal service issued a stamp on 7 October 1976, primarily for domestic use, depicting the then new building.

See also 

 List of theatres in North Korea

Notes and references

Further reading

External links 
 February 8 House of Culture theatre control room in 1975 by Bob Hartley archived
 Photo of the February 8 House of Culture, 1975 by Bob Hartley archived
 Photo of the 25 April House of Culture, circa 1995
 Photo of the 25 April House of Culture, circa 2010

Theatres in North Korea
Buildings and structures in Pyongyang
Stalinist architecture
Theatres completed in 1975
1975 establishments in North Korea
20th-century architecture in North Korea